France has competed at every celebration of the Mediterranean Games since the 1951 Mediterranean Games. As of 2013, French athletes have won a total of 1,641 medals.

Medal tables

Medals by Mediterranean Games

Below the table representing all French medals around the games. As of the completion of the 2013 Games, France had won 1,641 medals, 603 of them gold.

Medals by sport

Athletics

See also
 France at the Olympics
 France at the Paralympics
 Sports in France

References

External links